Christopher Wilmarth (1943 – November 19, 1987) was an American artist, known for producing sculptures using primarily glass and steel.

Early life
Christopher Wilmarth was born on June 11, 1943 in Sonoma, California. He was raised in Sonoma County and Palo Alto, California before moving to New York City in the 1960s. He earned a B.F.A. from Cooper Union in 1966.

Career
Wilmarth was a professor of sculpture at Cooper Union and Columbia University.

Wilmarth arrived at glass as his preferred medium after moving to New York City, influenced by other minimalists, such as Donald Judd and Carl Andre, and the city scape. As a material, glass was capable of capturing, reflecting, and refracting light to illusory and emotional effect. His artistic practise was influenced by poetry and music, which can be seen through his choice of titles, as well as Romanticism and Modernists such as Henri Matisse and Constantin Brancusi.

In 1973, Wilmarth began a series of sculptures titled Nine Clearings for a Standing Man. Each work consisted of a sheet of subtly bent steel behind a sheet of etched glass. The Art Institute of Chicago, the Carnegie Museums of Pittsburgh, the Dallas Museum of Art, the Nasher Sculpture Center, the Des Moines Art Center, the Fogg Museum, the Hirshhorn Museum and Sculpture Garden, the Honolulu Museum of Art, the Metropolitan Museum of Art, the Museum of Modern Art, the Philadelphia Museum of Art, the Saint Louis Art Museum, the Wadsworth Atheneum, the Walker Art Center, and the Whitney Museum of American Art are among the public collections holding work by Wilmarth.

In 1978, Wilmarth abandoned art dealer representation and established The Studio of the First Amendment, where he hosted his own exhibitions independently.

Death
On November 19, 1987, Wilmarth was found dead of an apparent suicide at his home in Red Hook, Brooklyn. He was 44.

In 2001, Wilmarth's wife, Susan Wilmarth-Rabineau, donated her late husband's archive of work to the Harvard Art Museums.

References
 Madoff, Steven Henry, Christopher Wilmarth: Light and Gravity, Princeton University Press, 2004 
 Rosenstock, Laura, Christopher Wilmarth, Museum of Modern Art, 1989
 Saywell, Edward, Christopher Wilmarth: Drawing into Sculpture, Harvard Art Museums, 2003 
 Wilmarth, Christopher, Christopher Wilmarth: Layers, Works from 1961-1984, Hirshl & Adler Modern, 1984
 Wilmarth, Christopher, Christopher Wilmarth: Inside Out, Robert Miller Gallery, 2003 
 Wilmarth, Christopher, Christopher Wilmarth: Breath, Privately Published, USA, 1982 
 Wilmarth, Christopher, Christopher Wilmarth: Sculpture and Painting from the 1960s and 1980s, Sidney Janis Gallery, 1997

Footnotes

1943 births
1987 suicides
20th-century American sculptors
Modern sculptors
Artists who committed suicide
Suicides by hanging in New York City
1987 deaths
People from Sonoma, California
Sculptors from California
Cooper Union alumni
Cooper Union faculty
Columbia University faculty